The Phillips Music Company was a music store in Boyle Heights, Los Angeles, that operated from 1935 to 1989. It was situated at 2455 Brooklyn Avenue. The store was run by musician William "Bill" Phillips, who was born in 1910 as William Isaacs. It was a store of many parts;s:; it sold records, sheet music, an assortment of instruments, radios, televisions, electronic appliances, phonographs, andat one point in time at one point in tim  even sporting goods, the store brought music to a community populated with Japanese, Mexican, and Jewish Americans. The store introduced its own soundtrack to a world not yet familiar with multiculturalism. This introduction allowed the outside community to create their own music, introducing a homogeneous world to multiculturalism over the airwaves.

The Remembrance 
In 1936, "Bill" Phillips opened the Phillips Music Company storefront in Boyle Heights on Brooklyn Avenue in a spot that is now part of Cesar Chavez Avenue. The store became the local hangout for the outside community, of many cultural backgrounds. Aside from household appliances, the store carried a wide array of instruments and records in Latin jazz, classical rock, Cuban mambo, and Yiddish swing.

Boyle Heights was the poster neighborhood of democracy, because of its diversity lasting from the 1930s through the 1940s. The community children who were Japanese, Jewish, and Spanish would go to the store for hours and create music together in one of the small recording booths that were available in the store, test instruments, listen to music and just hangout. It was a Jewish-Mexican-Japanese musical utopia.

"Bill" Phillips wanted to help the community of Boyle Heights through the resource that was the Phillips Music Company. He would often give free lessons and donate instruments to local school music programs. Bands like Los Lobos were some of the children who were able to foster their talents in the Phillips Music Store. The store was able to help foster a unique sound that rang of a Japanese, Mexican, and Jewish harmony.

At the close of World War II, the Jewish communities and stores started moving out of Boyle Heights and into other Los Angeles neighborhoods, but the Phillips Music Store remained until it closed in 1989.

The commemoration of the Philips Music Store continues into the present. On a midsummer's night in August 2011, a performance titled "A night at the Phillips Music Company" was held at Bunker Hill's California Plaza to pay homage to Boyle Heights multicultural legacy.

The performances included bands like Little Willie G., Ollin, Ruben Guevera, Eastside Luvers, Hiroshima, La Santa Cecilia, and Ceci Bastida, demonstrating the multicultural permeance the Phillips Music Store created.

Demographic change 
The Phillips Music Company was located in Boyle Heights, Los Angeles, an area known for its diversity, including Jews, Latinos, (mainly Chicanos), Yugoslav (Serbian and Croatian) immigrants, Portuguese people, and Japanese Americans living in the neighborhood from 1920 through the 1960s.

By 1940, the Boyle Heights population consisted of about 35,000 Jewish Americans, 15,000 Mexican Americans, and 5,000 Japanese Americans.

As of 2011, the diverse population of Boyle Heights is a community where 95% of the population is Latino and Hispanic.

Following the demographic shift from a diverse heterogeneous community to a community boasting of racial homogeneity, the Phillips Music Company closed its doors in 1989.

The hub of multiculturalism it fostered, through the invention of music by a diverse community, can be heard in the music of the present in local bands like Los Lobos, Thee Midniters, and Ollin. This sound of multiculturalism the Phillips Music Company fostered continues to exist despite the store's conclusion.

References 

Companies based in Los Angeles
Defunct music companies